The Jardin botanique de Mont Cenis is an alpine botanical garden located on Mont Cenis above the town of Lanslebourg-Mont-Cenis, Savoie, Rhône-Alpes, France. The garden was created in 1976 at an altitude of about 2000 meters above sea level, and now contains about 800 plants.

See also 
 List of botanical gardens in France

References 
 Jardin botanique de Mont Cenis
 123 Savoie entry (French)

Mont Cenis, Jardin botanique de
Mont Cenis, Jardin botanique de
Protected areas established in 1976
1976 establishments in France